Boy & Bear are an Australian indie folk band formed in 2009, consisting of David Hosking (vocals and guitar), Killian Gavin (vocals and guitar), Tim Hart (drums and vocals), Jonathan Hart (vocals, banjo, mandolin and keyboards), and David Symes (bass). The band has released two EPs and four studio albums. The first two albums, Moonfire (August 2011) and Harlequin Dream (August 2013), reached the top ten of the Australian albums chart. Their third album, Limit of Love, was released on 9 October 2015, in Australia, New Zealand, the United States, and Canada, and on 30 October in the UK and Europe. On 27 September 2019, after a four-year break, they released their long-awaited fourth studio album, Suck on Light.

History

2009–2010: Formation
Boy & Bear was formed in 2009 in Sydney, beginning as a solo project for singer-songwriter Dave Hosking. In February 2009, Hosking uploaded a track, "The Storm", to the Unearthed program on radio station Triple J, and it became a featured song at the station. Hosking met Killian Gavin, who was a singer-songwriter and guitarist in Ovell, and the pair started jamming together. Tim Hart, from another university band, Wintersound, joined as a drummer and singer-songwriter. Then they expanded with Hart's brother Jon (ex-Wintersound) on keyboard, vocals, mandolin and banjo and Jake Tarasenko (ex-Tripartisan Approach) on bass guitar. All five had fronted their own groups and became friends after regularly sharing the stage at gigs. Their songwriting usually has Hosking strumming chords on a guitar, Gavin writing the hooks, and the Hart brothers providing backing vocal lyrics, keyboard parts and drum lines. On 21 October, they issued an independent single, "Mexican Mavis", which was a featured song for the "Next Crop '09" segment on Triple J. In November 2009, the band described its style as "a combination of drivey indie folk and choral harmonies".

Aside from Triple J, the band received national airplay on NovaFM. The group signed with Island Records Australia, and in 2013, they signed internationally with Nettwerk.

After winning the 2009 Unearthed competition, they gained a performance spot at Homebake in December. They later toured Australia backing Angus and Julia Stone and Hungry Kids of Hungary. 

In 2010, they toured the UK supporting Laura Marling and Alessi's Ark, and later supported Mumford & Sons on their Australian tour. They also featured on Passenger's album 'Flight of the Crow'. In May Boy & Bear released their debut extended play, With Emperor Antarctica, which peaked at No. 63 on the ARIA Singles Chart. In the same year, they recorded the song "Fall at Your Feet" for He Will Have His Way, a tribute album to singer-songwriter brothers Tim and Neil Finn. Boy & Bear's version of "Fall at Your Feet" was listed at No. 5 on the Triple J Hottest 100, 2010. Another of their tracks, "Rabbit Song", was placed at No. 45. In November 2010 their cover of "Fall at Your Feet" peaked at No. 34 on the ARIA Singles Chart. 

In April 2011, their early single "Mexican Mavis" was featured on US TV series 90210, season three episode "Nerdy Little Secrets".

2011–2012: Moonfire
On 5 August 2011, Boy & Bear released their debut album Moonfire. It was recorded in Nashville, Tennessee with producer, Joe Chiccarelli and reached No. 2 on the ARIA Albums Chart. During that year, single "Feeding Line" debuted at No. 49. In December, Moonfire finished third in the Triple J album poll of 2011. It also reached platinum sales. On the Triple J Hottest 100, 2011 Boy & Bear were listed three times, with "Part Time Believer" and "Milk & Sticks" at No. 50 and No. 49, respectively, while "Feeding Line" reached No. 4. At the ARIA Music Awards of 2011 Boy & Bear won in five categories: Breakthrough Artist – Single for "Feeding Line"; and Album of the Year, Best Group, Breakthrough Artist – Album and Best Adult Alternative Release for Moonfire. The following year, the band received an ARIA nomination for Best Group.

In October 2012, it was announced that the original bass-guitarist Jake Tarasenko had left the band 'to pursue other interests'. He was replaced by David Symes, who had previously worked as a session musician for The Sleepy Jackson, Sarah Blasko and Marcia Hines. The group also announced that they had started work on a follow-up album.

2013–2014: Harlequin Dream
Boy & Bear released their second album on 16 August 2013, titled Harlequin Dream. It debuted at #1 on the ARIA charts. Its release was preceded by the lead single "Southern Sun", a song which paid homage to Richard Clapton's relaxed 1970s steel guitar sound. In 2013 Boy & Bear were nominated for three ARIA awards including, Best Group, Best Rock Album and Producer of the Year with Wayne Connolly. The album was also nominated for a J Award and was ranked #7 in triple j's Top 10 Albums of 2013 poll in the same year. From Harlequin Dreams release until the end of 2014, Boy & Bear completed three international tours, covering AUS/NZ/US/CAN/UK/EU and totalling 168 shows.

Boy & Bear received an ARIA nomination in 2014 for Best Australia Live Act. The album went Platinum in 2016.

2015–2017: Limit of Love
From April to May 2015 Boy & Bear teamed up with producer Ethan Johns (Ryan Adams, Kings of Leon, Kaiser Chiefs) at Peter Gabriel's Real World Studio in the UK to record their third album. The album was recorded live and straight to tape, with virtually no overdubs. On 13 August the band announced the album and its lead single "Walk the Wire", which was added to high rotation on triple j. Limit of Love was released on 9 October 2015 in Australia debuting at #1 on the ARIA charts, New Zealand, North America and Canada and will be available from 30 October in the United Kingdom and Europe. The album was certified Gold in Australia in 2018.

2018–2019: Suck on Light 
In July 2018 the band began posting pictures of them in a recording studio for their fourth album.

The band's fourth album, Suck on Light, was released on 27 September 2019. Produced by the band and Collin Dupuis at Nashville's Southern Ground Studios, and mixed in part by mixer Tom Elmhirst, the 12-track album includes the singles "Hold Your Nerve", "Work of Art" and "Telescope".

2020: At Golden Retriever Studios 
In April 2020, Boy & Bear announced the release of their forthcoming acoustic album titled At Golden Retriever Studios, set for release in September 2020. The band said "When we tour the USA we often get asked to perform our songs acoustically when we are on the radio... It gave us the idea to record a selection of acoustic tracks and present them as an album."

2022-present: Boy & Bear
On 8 April 2022, Boy & Bear released "State of Flight", their first single since 2019, and their first released independently. Throughout June and July 2022, the group celebrated the 10 year anniversary celebration of their album, Moonfire with an extensive national and regional tour. On 23 September 2022, Boy & Bear released "Just to Be Kind". In March 2023, the group released "Apex" and announced their fifth studio would be released on 26 May 2023.

Discography

Studio albums

Live albums

Extended plays

SinglesNotes'''

Awards and nominations

APRA Awards
The APRA Awards are presented annually from 1982 by the Australasian Performing Right Association (APRA), "honouring composers and songwriters". Boy & Bear have been nominated for one award.

|-
|rowspan="2"|2012 || Boy & Bear (Killian Gavin, Jonathon Hart, Timothy Hart, David Hosking, Jacob Tarasenko) || Breakthrough Songwriter of the Year || 
|-
|"Feeding Line" (Killian Gavin, Jonathon Hart, Timothy Hart, David Hosking, Jacob Tarasenko) || Song of the Year || 
|-
|rowspan="2"|2014 || "Harlequin Dream" (Killian Gavin, Jonathon Hart, Timothy Hart, David Hosking) ||rowspan="2"| Song of the Year || 
|-
| "Southern Sun" (Killian Gavin, Jonathon Hart, Timothy Hart, David Hosking) || 

ARIA Awards
The ARIA Music Awards are presented annually from 1987 by the Australian Recording Industry Association (ARIA). In 2011 Boy & Bear won five awards from seven nominations. The group performed their leading single, "Feeding Line", at the awards ceremony.Boy and Bear dominate ARIA awards – Australian Broadcasting Corporation – Retrieved 28 November 2011. They received further nominations in 2012, 2013, 2014 & 2016.

|-
|rowspan="7"| 2011 || rowspan="2"|"Feeding Line" || Single of the Year ||  
|-
| Breakthrough Artist – Single ||  
|-
| rowspan="4"|Moonfire || Album of the Year ||  
|-
| Best Group ||  
|-
| Breakthrough Artist – Album ||  
|-
| Best Adult Alternative Album ||  
|-
| Moonfire – Joe Chiccarelli || Producer of the Year ||  
|-
| 2012 || "Big Man" || Best Group ||  
|-
| rowspan="3"| 2013 || rowspan="3"| Harlequin Dream || Best Group ||  
|-
| Best Rock Album ||  
|-
| Producer of the Year ||  
|-
| 2014 || National Tour || Best Australian Live Act ||  
|-
| 2016 || Limit of Love || Best Rock Album ||  

Australian Music Prize
The Australian Music Prize (the AMP) is an annual award of $30,000 given to an Australian band or solo artist in recognition of the merit of an album released during the year of award. The commenced in 2005.

|-
| 2011
| Moonfire| Australian Music Prize
| 
|-

J Awards
The J Awards are an annual series of Australian music awards that were established by the Australian Broadcasting Corporation's youth-focused radio station Triple J. They commenced in 2005.

|-
| J Awards of 2013
|Harlequin Dream''
| Australian Album of the Year
| 
|-
| J Awards of 2015
| "Walk the Wire"
| Australian Video of the Year
|

National Live Music Awards
The National Live Music Awards (NLMAs) are a broad recognition of Australia's diverse live industry, celebrating the success of the Australian live scene. The awards commenced in 2016.

|-
| National Live Music Awards of 2016
| themselves 
| International Live Achievement (Group)
|

References

External links

APRA Award winners
ARIA Award winners
Australian indie pop groups
Australian indie rock groups
Australian indie folk groups
Musical groups established in 2009
Musical groups from Sydney
Nettwerk Music Group artists
Island Records artists